Sätra Nature Reserve is a nature reserve in northern Uppsala County in Sweden.

Sätra Nature Reserve consists of an area of old-growth forest dominated by spruce. The forest has been untouched since at least the 1860s. A number of orchids are known to grow in the area, including Cypripedium calceolus and broad-leaved helleborine. The nature reserve is part of the EU-wide Natura 2000-network.

References

Nature reserves in Sweden
Natura 2000 in Sweden
Geography of Uppsala County
Tourist attractions in Uppsala County